Clifford Valmore Olander (born April 15, 1955) is a former American football quarterback who played three seasons with the San Diego Chargers of the National Football League (NFL). He was drafted by the Chargers in the fifth round of the 1977 NFL Draft. He played college football at New Mexico State University. He was also a member of the Edmonton Eskimos of the Canadian Football League (CFL).

Early years and college career
Olander first attended Clear Creek High School in League City, Texas before transferring to Arvada High School in Arvada, Colorado.

Olander was a quarterback and punter for the New Mexico State Aggies. He recorded career passing totals of 1,307 yards and seven touchdowns.

Professional career
Olander was selected by the San Diego Chargers of the NFL with the 128th pick in the 1977 NFL Draft. He played for the Chargers from 1977 to 1979. He made his only start in a 12-7 victory over the defending Super Bowl champion Oakland Raiders on November 20, 1977. Olander was a member of the NFL's New York Giants from 1980 to 1981. He was a member of the Edmonton Eskimos of the CFL from 1982 to 1983, winning the 70th Grey Cup in 1982. He was released by the Eskimos in June 1983.

In January 1984, the Michigan Panthers of the United States Football League (USFL) traded Ken Bungarda to the Arizona Wranglers for the rights to Olander. In February 1984, he was released by the Panthers and signed by the Oklahoma Outlaws.

Coaching career
Olander was offensive coordinator of the Irvin High School Rockets from 1992 to 2005. He became head coach in August 2005 and later resigned in January 2011.

References

External links
Just Sports Stats
College stats

Living people
1955 births
American football quarterbacks
American football punters
Canadian football quarterbacks
American players of Canadian football
New Mexico State Aggies football players
San Diego Chargers players
New York Giants players
Edmonton Elks players
Arizona Wranglers players
Michigan Panthers players
Oklahoma Outlaws players
Players of American football from Hartford, Connecticut
Sportspeople from Hartford, Connecticut